The women's doubles tennis tournament at the 2014 South American Games in Santiago was held from 12 to 15 March on the clay courts of the Estadio Nacional Julio Martínez Prádanos in Ñuñoa.

Tie-breaks were used for the first two sets of each match, which was the best of three sets. If the score was tied at one set all, a 'super tie-break' (the first pairing to win at least 10 points by a margin of two points) would be used.

Chileans Fernanda Reyes and Cecilia Costa Melgar were the defending champions, but Reyes was not eligible by her national delegation in this edition. Costa Melgar played alongside Daniela Seguel and they finished in fourth place, being defeated by Brazilians Paula Cristina Gonçalves and Laura Pigossi in the bronze medal match, 7–6(7–4), 7–5.

Venezuelans Adriana Pérez and Andrea Gamiz defeated Paraguayans Verónica Cepede Royg and Montserrat González 7–6(9–7), 3–6, [10–5] in the final to claim the first gold medal for Venezuela in the tennis competition.

Calendar
Matches took place between 12 and 15 March.

Seeds

Results

Draw

References
Main Draw (Federación de Tenis de Chile)

Tennis at the 2014 South American Games
South